Reginald Patrick Deller (27 March 1933 - 8 February 2001) is an English former cricketer.  Deller was a right-handed batsman who bowled right-arm fast-medium.  He was born at Paddington, London.

Deller made his first-class debut for Middlesex against Hampshire at Lord's in the 1951 County Championship.  He made two further first-class appearances for Essex, against Glamorgan at Lord's, and Oxford University at the University Parks.  In his three first-class matches, he scored a total of 4, while with the ball he took 2 wickets at a bowling average of 63.50, with best figures of 1/35.  He also played for the Middlesex Second XI between 1949 and 1954.

References

External links
Reg Deller at ESPNcricinfo
Reg Deller at CricketArchive

1933 births
2001 deaths
People from Paddington
English cricketers
Middlesex cricketers